Gabriel Alejandro Burstein (born 4 October 1975) is a football manager and former player. Born in Argentina, he currently coaches Israel U23

Professional football
Burstein began his football career in the River Plate club in his home country of Argentina, where he played until the age of sixteen. He then joined the Israeli football club Maccabi Herzliya F.C. as a professional player. He was forced by an injury to end his career at the age of twenty-three. In 2019, Burstein became the coach of the Israel women's national football team. He was replaced by Gili Landau in July 2021. Following his stint with the national team, he was highly sought after by domestic clubs and was appointed as coach for Maccabi Kishronot Hadera.

Personal life
Burstein's native language is Spanish, and he speaks English, Portuguese, and Hebrew fluently. He has some knowledge of French.

Honors
 Best foreign coach of the Israeli championship 2010-2012 / 2019-2020 / 2020-2021
 Best Argentine coach abroad 2019-2020 / 2020-2021

References

1975 births
Living people
Footballers from Buenos Aires
Argentine footballers
Jewish footballers
Argentine football managers
Jewish Argentine sportspeople
Argentine emigrants to Israel
Citizens of Israel through Law of Return
Israeli footballers
Israeli football managers
Jewish Israeli sportspeople
Women's association football managers
Israeli people of Argentine-Jewish descent
Sportspeople of Argentine descent
Association footballers not categorized by position